Craig Alan Blaising (born 1949) is the former Executive Vice President and Provost of Southwestern Baptist Theological Seminary. Blaising earned a Doctor of Theology from Dallas Theological Seminary  and a Doctor of Philosophy degree at the University of Aberdeen, Scotland, a Master of Theology Dallas Theological Seminary, and a Bachelor of Science in Aerospace Engineering from the University of Texas at Austin. He is a recognized authority in patristic studies and eschatology and is one of the primary proponents of "progressive dispensationalism."

Prior to serving at Southwestern, Blaising was Joseph Emerson Brown Professor of Christian Theology and associate vice president for doctoral studies at Southern Baptist Theological Seminary.  Before that, he served as professor of systematic theology at Dallas Theological Seminary.  In 1978, Blaising was the first faculty member to occupy the Evangelical Bible Chair at the University of Texas at Arlington.

Blaising is a member of the Evangelical Theological Society.  He was elected as the organization's national president in 2005 and served as the president of the Southwest Region in 1986-87.  He is also a member of the International Association of Patristic Studies, the North American Patristics Society, and the Society of Biblical Literature.

Works

Books

Journal articles 

 - forthcoming

Other contributions 

Dr. Blaising has also contributed various entries in The Encyclopedia of Early Christianity, 2nd ed. (1997) and The Evangelical Dictionary of Theology (1984 and 2001).

References

1949 births
Living people
20th-century American male writers
20th-century evangelicals
21st-century American male writers
21st-century evangelicals
Alumni of the University of Aberdeen
American evangelicals
Cockrell School of Engineering alumni
Dallas Theological Seminary alumni
Dallas Theological Seminary faculty
Evangelical writers
Southwestern Baptist Theological Seminary faculty
University of Texas at Arlington faculty